Publius Rutilius Lupus was a Roman rhetorician who flourished during the reign of Tiberius. He was the author of a treatise on the figures of speech (de Figuris sententiarum et elocutionis), abridged from a similar work by the rhetorician Gorgias of Athens, who was the tutor of Cicero the Younger. In its present form the treatise is incomplete, as is clearly shown by the express testimony of Quintilian (Inst. ix.2.101–105 passim). Lupus also dealt with figures of sense and other rhetorical figures. The work is valuable chiefly as containing a number of examples, well translated into Latin, from the lost works of Greek rhetoricians. The author has been identified with the Lupus mentioned in the Ovidian catalogue of poets (Ex Ponto, iv.16), and was perhaps the son of the Publius Rutilius Lupus, who was a strong supporter of Pompey.

Editions
 D. Ruhnken (1768)
 F. Jacob (1837)
 Karl Halm in Rhetores Latini minores (1863)
 Edward Brooks Jr. (1970)

See also monographs by G. Dzialas (1860 and 1869), C. Schmidt (1865), J. Draheim (1874), Thilo Krieg (1896).

References

External links
P. Rutilii Lupi de figuris sententiarum et elocutions libri duo, accedunt Aquilae Romani et Julii Rufiniani de eodem argumento libri, David Ruhnken (ed.), Lugduni Batavorum, apud Samuelem et Joannem Luchtmans, 1768.
Rhetores latini minores, Carl Halm (ed.), Lipsiae in aedibus B. G. Teubneri, 1863, pp. 1 ff.

Ancient Roman rhetoricians
Lupus, Publius Rutilius
1st-century Romans